Barciszewo  is a village in the administrative district of Gmina Bartoszyce, within Bartoszyce County, Warmian-Masurian Voivodeship, in northern Poland, close to the border with the Kaliningrad Oblast of Russia.
After World War II the region was divided between Poland and the Soviet Union.

References

Barciszewo